Anvil Green is a small settlement located near Waltham in Kent, England, about nine miles (14.4 km) north east of Ashford.

External links

Villages in Kent